Kanpur or Cawnpore (/kɑːnˈpʊər/ pronunciation (help·info)) is an industrial city in the central-western part of the state of Uttar Pradesh, India. Founded in 1207, Kanpur became one of the most important commercial and military stations of British India. Kanpur was also the financial capital of Uttar Pradesh. Nestled on the banks of Ganges River, Kanpur stands as the major financial and industrial centre of North India and also the ninth-largest urban economy in India. Today it is famous for its colonial architecture, gardens, parks and fine quality leather, plastic and textile products which are exported mainly to the West.

It is known for its rich cultural heritage, bustling markets, vibrant nightlife, beautiful parks and gardens, delicious cuisine and much more. The city is home to historical monuments such as the Jajmau Ghat which dates back to 17th century AD. 

Kanpur is also home to several historical sites such as the Bithoor Museum, Bhitargaon Temple, European Cemetry and Nanarao Park. 

Kanpur also hosts various events throughout year. 

It is the 12th most populous city and the 11th most populous urban agglomeration in India. Kanpur was an important British garrison town until 1947, when India gained independence. The urban district of Kanpur Nagar serves as the headquarters of the Kanpur Division, Kanpur Range and Kanpur Zone.

With the first woollen mill of India, commonly known as the Lal Imli (literally meaning "Red Tamarind", for a brand produced by the mill) by the British India Corporation established here in 1876 by Alexander MacRobert. The eastern and northern façades of the mill are reminiscent of the Palace of Westminster, due to their architecture, proximity to the Ganges river and with the north-east corner of the mill being topped by a clock tower similar to Big Ben in London. This similarity underscores the city's importance and prestige during the British times, which extends till date; making the Lal Imli — a great highlight of the city. The city is also widely regarded as the "Leather City of the World" and is predominantly nicknamed as the "Manchester of the East", for its chemical, textile and leather industries.

According to 2011 Indian census, it is the eleventh most populous urban city and the largest urban agglomeration in Uttar Pradesh while the population of city and its suburb were around 5 million making it the eighth-most populous metropolitan area in India. Furthermore, it is considered the world's most polluted city by particulate matter concentration. In 2018, Kanpur was considered by the World Health Organization as the city with the world's worst air pollution.

History 
In 1207, Raja Kanh Deo of the  Kanhpuriya clan of Rajputs established the city of Kanhpur and made it his capital, which later came to be known as Kanpur.

1857 Uprising 

In the 19th century, Cawnpore was an important British garrison with barracks for 7,000 soldiers. During the First Indian War of Independence of 1857, 900 British men, women and children were besieged in the fortifications for 22 days by rebels under Nana Sahib Peshwa. They surrendered on the agreement that they would get safe passage to the nearby Satti Chaura Ghat whereupon they would board barges and be allowed to go by river to Allahabad.

Though controversy surrounds what exactly happened at the Satti Chaura Ghat, and who fired the first shot, it is known that, soon afterwards, the departing British were shot at by the sepoys and were either killed or captured. Some of the British officers later claimed that the sepoys had, on purpose, placed the boats as high in the mud as possible, to cause delay. They also claimed that Nana Sahib's camp had previously arranged for the sepoys to fire upon and to kill all of the English. Although the East India Company later accused Nana Sahib of betrayal and murder of innocent people, no evidence has ever been found to prove that Nana Sahib had planned or ordered the massacre. Some historians believe that the Satti Chaura Ghat massacre was the result of confusion and not of any plan implemented by Nana Sahib or of his associates. Lieutenant Mowbray Thomson, one of the four male survivors of the massacre, believed that the rank-and-file sepoys who spoke to him did not know of the killing to come.

Many were killed and the remaining 200 British women and children were brought back to shore and sent to a building called the Bibighar (the ladies' home). After some time, the commanders of the rebels decided to kill their hostages. The rebel soldiers refused to carry out orders and butchers from the nearby town were brought in to kill the hostages three days before the British entered the city on 18 July. The dismembered bodies were thrown into a deep well nearby. The British, under General Neill, retook the city and committed a series of retaliations against the rebel sepoys and those civilians caught in the area, including women, children and old men. The Cawnpore Massacre, as well as similar events elsewhere, were seen by the British as justification for unrestrained vengeance. "Remember Cawnpore" became a British war cry for the rest of the war.

Urban infrastructure 

The metropolitan region defined under JNNURM by Kanpur Nagar Nigam, includes the Kanpur Nagar Nigam area, 8 kilometres around KNN boundary and newly included 47 villages of Unnao district on the north-eastern side, it extends to Murtaza Nagar, in the west its limit is up to Akbarpur, Kanpur Dehat Nagar Panchayat limit, on the eastern side the limit has been expanded on the road leading to Fatehpur and in extended up to. The metropolitan region area includes the area of Shuklaganj Municipal Committee (Nagar Palika), Unnao Municipal Committee (Nagar Palika), Akbarpur Village Authority (Nagar Panchayat) and Bithoor Village Authority (Nagar Panchayat) area. In 1997–98, total metropolitan region area has increased to 89131.15 hectare out of which 4,743.9 hectare (5.31%) was non-defined (prohibited area) and rest 29,683 hectare and 54,704 hectare (61.39%) was urban and rural area respectively.

Climate 

Like most of lowland northern India, Kanpur has a monsoon-influenced humid subtropical climate (Cwa) bordering on a hot semi-arid climate (BSh) under the Köppen climate classification.

Demographics 

As per the provisional results of 2011 census, Kanpur city has a population of 4,581,000. The literacy rate was 79.65 per cent and sex ratio was 862.

There are 35 Parsis in Kanpur with their Fire temple at The Mall.

Hinduism is a majority in Kanpur with a sizeable minority of Muslims. Sikhs, Christians and Buddhists are below 2 percent.

Awadhi is the native dialect. Hindi and Urdu are the predominant languages in the city. Punjabi is spoken by 1.25%, while Bengali is spoken by over 11,000 people in the city.

Government and politics

Administration

General administration
Kanpur division which consists of six districts, and is headed by the divisional commissioner of Kanpur, who is an Indian Administrative Service (IAS) officer of high seniority, the commissioner is the head of local government institutions (including municipal corporations) in the division, is in charge of infrastructure development in his division, and is also responsible for maintaining law and order in the division. The district magistrate of Kanpur reports to the divisional commissioner. The current commissioner is Dr. Raj Shekhar.

Kanpur district administration is headed by the district magistrate of Kanpur, who is an IAS officer. The DM is in charge of property records and revenue collection for the central government and oversees the elections held in the city. The DM is also responsible for maintaining law and order in the city. The DM is assisted by a chief development officer; four additional district magistrates for finance/revenue, city, land acquisition, and civil supply; one city magistrat; and seven additional city magistrates. The district has three tehsils viz. Sadar, Bilhaur and Ghatampur, each headed by a sub-divisional magistrate. The current DM is Mr. Vishak G

Civic Administration 

Kanpur municipality was established on 22 November 1861, and was upgraded to a municipal corporation in 1959. The local government of Kanpur is governed under the Municipal act for the state, Uttar Pradesh Municipal Corporation Act, 1959.

The area under the municipal limits of Kanpur city, or Kanpur Municipal Corporation, is spread over an area of 260 square km. It oversees civic activities in the city. The head of the corporation is the mayor, but the executive and administration of the corporation are the responsibility of the municipal commissioner, who is an Uttar Pradesh government-appointed Provincial Civil Service officer of high seniority. The executive wing is headed by municipal commissioner, Avinash Singh and has the following departments: Revenue, City Cleansing, Engineering, Marg Prakash, Health, Accounts, Personnel/HRD, Swasthya Vibhag, Education, Mukya Nagar Lekha Vibhag, Pariyojna, Udyan Vibhag, Chikitsa Vibhag, Encroachment & Cattle Catching Department. There is also an executive committee present in the city.

The development of infrastructure in the city is overseen by Kanpur Development Authority (KDA), which comes under the Housing Department of Uttar Pradesh government. The divisional commissioner of Kanpur acts as the ex-officio Chairman of KDA, whereas a vice chairperson, a government-appointed IAS officer, looks after the daily matters of the authority. The current vice-chairman of Kanpur Development Authority is K. Vijayendra Pandian.

The municipality receives revenue from general tax, advertisement tax, income from municipal properties, grants from state government etc.

Law and order 
The Kanpur District Court is headed by the district judge of Kanpur, who is assisted by numerous additional district judges, civil judges (senior division) and additional civil judges. Kanpur is a notified metropolitan area by UP Government under Code of Criminal Procedure, 1973, and therefore has a chief metropolitan magistrate, who is assisted by several metropolitan magistrates. The 2017 district judge was Shashi Kant Shukla, and the chief metropolitan magistrate was Shabistan Aquil.

Police administration

Kanpur district comes under the Kanpur Police Zone and Kanpur Police Range, Kanpur Zone is headed by an additional director general-ranked Indian Police Service (IPS) officer, and the Kanpur Range is headed inspector general-ranked IPS officer. The current ADG, Kanpur Zone is Avanish Chandra, and IG, Kanpur Range is Alok Singh.

The district police is headed by a deputy inspector general/senior superintendent of police (DIG/SSP), who is an IPS officer, and is assisted by seven superintendents of police or additional superintendents of police for east, west, south, rural area, crime, traffic and modern control, who are either IPS officers or Provincial Police Service (PPS) officers. Each of the several police circles is headed by a circle officer (CO) in the rank of deputy superintendent of police. The current DIG/SSP is Sonia Singh.

Politics

Local politics 
The city is divided into 6 zones and 110 wards with a ward population range of 19,000 to 26,000 and 110 corporators directly elected from each ward. As mandated by the 74th constitutional amendment, there were 11 ward committees in Kanpur municipal corporation in 1991. Local elections were last held in 2017, when the mayor, Pramila Pandey from the BJP, was elected. The previous mayor had been Captain (retired) Jagatvir Singh Drona. As of 2006, Kanpur Municipal Council has an elected mayor-in-council system.

State politics 
Kanpur Nagar district encompasses one Lok Sabha constituency and ten Uttar Pradesh Vidhan Sabha constituencies. The city of Kanpur has one representative member of parliament in Lok Sabha for Kanpur, Satyadev Pachauri.

Civic Utilities 
The first development plan of the city was created by the Kanpur Development Board in 1943. This was followed by the masterplan being designed by the Town and Country Planning Department from 1962 to 1991, which was adopted after the establishment of the Kanpur Development Authority in 1974. The most recent masterplan is the Draft Master Plan of 2021 .

Electricity is supplied to the city by Kanpur Electricity Supply Company (KESCO), which is under the Uttar Pradesh Power Corporation Ltd (UPPCL). Fire services are under the state, Uttar Pradesh Fire Service.

Water supply, sewerage is done by the Jal Kal vibhag of KMC. Infrastructure development and maintenance is done by the state's body, UP Jal Nigam. The piped water supply of Kanpur City was started in 1892. After construction of Ganga Barrage on the river, a permanent and reliable source for the water supply got available to provide 1600 mld raw water. The city also receives water from the catchment areas of rivers Ganga and Pandu. However, while the total water supply requirement is 600 mld only 385 mld of potable water is being supplied. The city loses water due to leaky pipes and contamination of natural water sources. There is a severe water crisis in Kanpur.

In 2015, Ganga Pollution Control Unit in Kanpur got about Rs 200 crores to make 4 STPs functional. The city then reported having 3 STPs for domestic waste. In 2017, there was only one sewage treatment plant for waste from tanneries, biggest source of industrial pollution to the Ganga, was to be replaced by a newer one costing 400 cr as the old one could only treat 9 MLD at the most. 823.1 MLD of untreated sewage and 212.42 MLD of industrial effluent flow into the river. In 2019, another STP costing worth Rs 816.25 was to be set up. As of 2020, While the government has stopped pollution from Kanpur's biggest drain, Sishamau, of Kanpur's 48 drains, eight still have no devices to stop effluents.

Solid waste management is handled by the KMC. As of 2015, Kanpur generates 1,500 tonnes of solid wastes from domestic and industrial sources, 64,000 tonnes of hazardous waste annually which includes metals and waste generated by tanneries, dye industries and chemical industries; while coal ash produced in Kanpur amounts to 71,000 tonnes per annum.

Transport 

Airways

Ganesh Shankar Vidyarthi Airport has scheduled commercial flights to New Delhi, Mumbai, Kolkata, Bangalore, Hyderabad, Chennai and other cities of India. The nearest International Airport is the Chaudhary Charan Singh International Airport in Lucknow, which is around 77.1 km from Kanpur, Uttar Pradesh.

Railways

Kanpur Central is a major railhead and is among the busiest railway stations in the country. Rail routes connect it to all major cities in the state and the country. It is an A-1 category railway station coming under the Prayagraj railway division of North Central Railway zone of Indian Railways. Around 300 trains pass through the station daily. Other major railway stations serving the city include Kanpur Anwarganj, Govindpuri, Panki, Kalyanpur, Rawatpur, Chandari, Kanpur Bridge and Chakeri.

Roadways

The city has had chronic problems with maintaining local roads. There are several important National Highways that pass through Kanpur.

The UPSRTC Inter State Bus Station (ISBT) of Kanpur officially named as the "Shaheed Major Salman Khan Bus Station". It is locally known as the "Jhakarkati Bus Station". It provides buses to important cities of India. Other UPSRTC controlled Important Bus stations are Chunniganj Bus Stand for Farrukhabad, Bareilly and Uttranchal routes, Naubasta Bus Stand for Hamirpur route, Fazalganj is another hub for Private carriers.

Ring road

In 2011 it was reported by The Indian Express that "The National Highways Authority of India (NHAI) is all set to develop a four-lane outer ring road along the periphery of Kanpur with an aim to prevent traffic congestion in the industrial city caused by long-distance heavy vehicles. The new road, which will help the heavy vehicles to bypass the city, will be developed on Built, Operate and Transfer (BOT) basis under the phase-VII of National Highways Development Programme (NHDP)"

Kanpur Metro

The Kanpur Metro is a mass rapid transit (MRT) system in Kanpur. The metro is owned and operated by the Uttar Pradesh Metro Rail Corporation (UPMRC). It consists of two lines- Orange Line and Blue Line. The priority corridor of the Orange Line, which connects IIT Kanpur to Motijheel was inaugurated by the Prime Minister of India, Narendra Modi on 28 December 2021.

Education and research

Higher education

Prestigious public engineering institution Indian Institute of Technology Kanpur is located in Kanpur city. It was one of the first Indian Institutes of Technology established in 1959, created with the assistance of a consortium of nine US research universities as part of the Kanpur Indo-American Programme (KIAP). 

Other educational institutions in the city include three state universities. Chhatrapati Shahu Ji Maharaj University is one of the largest universities in northern India catering to urban and rural students offering professional and academic courses in the disciplines of Arts, Science, Commerce, Law, Engineering, Biotechnology, Computer Applications, Management and Medicine. 

Chandra Shekhar Azad University of Agriculture and Technology is an agricultural university named after the Indian revolutionary Chandrashekhar Azad which caters to the needs of the farming community of 29 districts of Uttar Pradesh. 

Harcourt Butler Technical University (HBTI) offers Bachelors, Masters, and Doctoral programs in engineering, as well as Masters programs in Business Administration, and Computer Applications. Dr.Ambedkar Institute of Technology for Handicapped, an institution to provide technical education to specially-abled students inaugurated by former Prime Minister Atal Bihari Vajpayee in 1997, is also situated in Kanpur. 

There is also private universities in the city like: Rama University part of the Rama Group. There are several good private Technical and Management institutions in the city.

Medical education
Ganesh Shankar Vidyarthi Memorial Medical College (GSVM Medical College) is a state-run medical college in Kanpur, Uttar Pradesh. It was founded in 1956 and named after Ganesh Shankar Vidyarthi, a freedom fighter and journalist from Kanpur. Lala Lajpat Rai Hospital, which is also known as Hallet Hospital, is associated with GSVM, Kanpur.

See also
 Kanpur Dehat (Lok Sabha constituency)
 List of cities in Uttar Pradesh
 List of engineering colleges in Kanpur
 List of people from Kanpur
 Renamed places in Kanpur
 List of twin towns and sister cities in India
 Second Battle of Cawnpore

References

External links

Kanpur city portal
Kanpur Dehat portal
kanpur Smart city
Kanpur News
 In Fisher's Drawing Room Scrap Book, 1834, as an illustration to Letitia Elizabeth Landon's poem :
 Cawnpore painted by Samuel Prout and engraved by C Mottram.

 
Articles containing potentially dated statements from 2011
Cities in Uttar Pradesh
Metropolitan cities in India